The Lincoln Academy of Illinois is a not-for-profit, non-partisan organization dedicated to recognizing contributions made by living Illinoisans. Named for Abraham Lincoln, the Academy administers the Order of Lincoln, the highest award given by the State of Illinois. Each year several persons are selected as Lincoln Laureates at a ceremony presided over by its president, the Governor of Illinois. The organization gives an annual Student Laureate award to one student from each four-year degree-granting institution of higher learning in Illinois, plus one student from the state's community colleges. Many prominent Illinoisans have received the Order of Lincoln.

History
After visiting the Illinois exhibit at the 1964 World's Fair, theater producer Michael Butler was inspired to start an organization to honor distinguished Illinoisans. Butler, who was then head of the state's Organization for Economic Development, submitted a proposal to this effect to Governor Otto Kerner, Jr. The Governor accepted the proposal and named Butler the first Chancellor of The Lincoln Academy of Illinois on December 2, 1964. The first convocation to honor Lincoln Laureates was held on February 12, 1965, at the Chicago Historical Society.  over 300 Illinoisans have received the award.

The Academy began awarding Student Laureate awards to outstanding college students in 1975.

Organization
The Academy is overseen by the President, who is the incumbent governor. Five other officers are elected for four-year terms by 18 Regents, who act as the board of directors. The chief executive officer is deemed the Chancellor. The Vice-Chancellor performs the duties of the Chancellor in his/her absence. Administrative duties are carried out by the Executive Director, finances are handled by the Treasurer, and meeting minutes are taken by the Secretary.

The 18 Regents are elected from among the Trustees. There are three types of trustees: General Trustees, Academic Trustees, and Rectors. There are 60 General Trustees, appointed for six-year terms by the Academy President or Trustees. The Academic Trustees are the chief executives of degree-granting institutions in the state, plus the presidents of multi-campus four-year institutions and a representative of the Illinois Community College Board. There are ten Rectors, who represent each category of the award.

Order of Lincoln Award
The Lincoln Academy elects several Laureates annually to the Order of Lincoln, the highest award given by the State of Illinois. The award is presented at a ceremony presided over by the President of the Academy (the Governor of Illinois). The ceremony rotates every three years between Springfield, Chicago, and other areas of the state. Honorees are presented with the Badge of the Academy and a citation of reasons for their selection.

Nominees are usually Illinoisans by birth or residence.  Nominations are solicited from the Academy's Officers, Regents, and Rectors. Past Laureates and certain academics may also submit nominations. Candidates are nominated for their contributions to ten fields: agriculture; the arts and performing arts; business, industry and communications; education; government and law; labor; medicine and science; religion; social services; and sports.  Laureates are selected at a meeting of the Regents and Trustees.

Seleced honorees
Roger Adams, organic chemist who discovered CBD, awarded 1967
John Bardeen, physicist and electrical engineer, twice Nobel Prize laureate, awarded 1965
George Wells Beadle, Nobel Prize laureate 1958, awarded 1966
Emily Bear, composer and pianist, awarded 2018
Gwendolyn Brooks, poet, awarded 1997
Avery Brundage, fifth President of the International Olympic Committee, awarded 1965
Hillary Clinton, United States Secretary of State, awarded 2014
Jean Driscoll, wheelchair racer, awarded 2012
Roger Ebert, Pulitzer prize winning film critic, awarded 2001
Rudolph Ganz, pianist, conductor and composer, awarded 1965
Paul Harvey, radio broadcaster, awarded 1987
 Burl Ives, singer, musician, actor, and author.
Mahalia Jackson, gospel singer, recording artist and civil rights activist, awarded 1967
Jackie Joyner-Kersee, track and field athlete, awarded 2005 
Shahid Khan, auto parts billionaire, philanthropist, UIUC College of Engineering alumnus, awarded 2011
Jim Lovell, astronaut, awarded 2012
Mary Ann McMorrow, Illinois Supreme Court Chief Justice, awarded 2007
Albert Cardinal Meyer, awarded 1965
Nathan M. Newmark, structural engineer, awarded 1965
William A. Patterson, President of United Airlines 1934–1966, awarded 1965
Walter Payton, football player, awarded 1987
Ronald Reagan, United States President, awarded 1981
Ludwig Mies van der Rohe, architect, awarded 1966
Ryne Sandberg, baseball player for the Chicago Cubs, awarded 2017
Paul Simon, United States Senator, awarded 1998
Archbishop Fulton J. Sheen, Illinois religious leader, awarded 1977
Mavis Staples, singer, actress, and civil rights activist, awarded 2021
Adlai Ewing Stevenson II, politician, 31st Governor of Illinois, awarded 1965
Scott Turow, author, awarded 2000
Studs Terkel, author, awarded 2004
Louise Taper, historian, awarded 2009

Student Laureate Award
The Lincoln Academy also presents the Abraham Lincoln Civic Engagement award to one graduating senior from each four-year college or university in the state, as well as one student from a community college. Each student, nominated by his/her respective institution, is named a Student Laureate and receives the Lincoln Medal, a certificate of merit, and a civic engagement monetary award. Student Laureates are chosen by the chief executive officers of their respective institutions, who also serve as Academic Trustees of The Lincoln Academy of Illinois. Student Laureates are honored for their overall excellence in curricular and extracurricular activities. The ceremony is held in the Old State Capitol, and is followed by a luncheon with the Governor at the Executive Mansion.

References

Non-profit corporations
Illinois culture
American awards